The history of monarchy in Canada stretches from pre-colonial times through to the present day. The date monarchy was established in Canada varies; some sources say it was when the French colony of New France was founded in the name of King Francis I in 1534, while others state it was in 1497, when John Cabot made landfall in what is thought to be modern day Newfoundland or Nova Scotia, making a claim in the name of King Henry VII. Europeans in the 16th and 17th centuries often considered the territories belonging to different aboriginal groups to be kingdoms. Nevertheless, the present Canadian monarchy can trace itself back to the Anglo-Saxon period and ultimately to the kings of the Angles and the early Scottish kings; monarchs reigning over Canada have included the those of France (to King Louis XV in 1763), those of the United Kingdom (to King George V in 1931), and those of Canada (to King Charles III as King of Canada today). Canadian historian Father Jacques Monet said of Canada's Crown, "[it is] one of an approximate half-dozen that have survived through uninterrupted inheritance from beginnings that are older than our Canadian institution itself."

Canada's first European monarchs instigated, funded, and supported the exploration and settlement of the country. After the Glorious Revolution in 1689, the sovereigns had their powers constrained by the tenets of constitutional monarchy and responsible government, thereby having less, and then no say in colonization, or policy, in general, the Crown coming to function as the guarantor of Canada's continuous and stable governance and as a nonpartisan safeguard against the abuse of power. Concurrent with constitutional developments, the Canadian colonies of France were, via war and treaties through the 18th century, ceded to King George III; four colonies were confederated by Queen Victoria in 1867 to form the Dominion of Canada, with other colonies and territories joining over the decades up to 1949; and Canada became a fully independent kingdom through the Statute of Westminster, 1931—enacted by King George V—and then the Constitution Act of 1982—brought into force by Elizabeth II, the Queen of Canada.

Pre-colonial
While no indigenous North Americans in what is now Canada had what would be seen today as an official monarchy, some aboriginal peoples, before their first encounters with French and British colonisers, were governmentally organised in a fashion similar to the occidental idea of monarchy. Europeans often considered territories belonging to different aboriginal groups to be kingdoms—such as along the north shore of the St Lawrence River, between the Trinity River and the Isle-aux-Coudres, and the neighbouring kingdom of Canada, which stretched west to the Island of Montreal—and the leaders of these communities were referred to as kings, particularly those chosen through heredity. Many had chieftains, whose powers varied from one nation to the next; in some instances, the chief would exercise considerable authority and influence on the decisions of the group, while, in others, he was more of a symbolic or ceremonial figure. In the latter cases, considering that many First Nations societies were governed by unwritten customs and codes of conduct, wherein the chieftain was bound to follow the advice of a council of elders, the form of government would have closely resembled a modern constitutional monarchy.

Hereditary chieftainship continues today; though, the chiefs are not sovereign and only have jurisdiction over traditional territories that fall outside of band-controlled reservation land; on reservation land, it is "up to the community's tolerance, or its politics, on how much [the hereditary chiefs are] involved in governance." The hereditary chiefs often serve as knowledge-keepers, responsible for the upholding of a First Nation's traditional customs, legal systems, and cultural practices.

Establishment of European colonies

The first French colonies in North America were established in the name of King Henry IV, one at Acadia (today Nova Scotia), founded three years into the 17th century, and the second at Port Royal, named to honour Henry. By 1610, the first British settlements were established on Newfoundland, which had been claimed in 1583 for Queen Elizabeth I. The following year, Henry Hudson embarked on the first trading voyage that led to the formation of the Hudson's Bay Company by Royal Charter from King Charles II; with it, the King claimed an area that covered what is now Alberta, Saskatchewan, Manitoba, Ontario, Minnesota, North Dakota, and more and called the area Rupert's Land, after Prince Rupert, who helped to form the HBC.

The French monarch also moved quickly and it was in 1602 that Aymar de Chaste was appointed as Viceroy of Canada to represent King Henry IV. In 1615, Quebec City was, on the recommendation of Samuel de Champlain, made a royal capital of the French empire in the Americas, with Champlain—who had previously been representative of, or lieutenant governor to, most viceroys of Canada—installed as the first viceregal representative of the King in New France.

Some 60 years later, New France was designated as a royal province of France itself and the governor general acted as the monarch's stand-in. One of the king's decrees was to send the filles du roi (Daughters of the King) to the province. As the population expanded, infrastructure such as the Chemin du Roi (King's Highway) was built and, through the 18th century, the kings gave financing to the construction of cities like Île-Royale and Louisbourg; the names of these locations reflecting their royal patronage.

As Europeans moved inland, they encountered the aboriginal peoples. Relations with them were originally considered to be between European and North American monarchs; though, for the French, that later changed to be one between sovereign and subject and, for the British, between European and aboriginal nations under one monarch, leading to the incorporation of treaties with the Crown into the political culture of Canada.

Respect between the British sovereign and indigenous chiefs was maintained, exemplified by gestures such as Queen Anne welcoming the "Four Mohawk Kings" at St James' Palace in 1710 and Anne paying for the construction of a chapel for the Mohawks (as they requested) and furnishing it with a reed organ and set of silver chalices (still held by the Mohawk Chapel in Brantford, Ontario) in 1712. Governor Frederick Haldimand, in the name of George III, granted land to the Six Nations of the Grand River after they lost their ancestral territories in what is now the state of New York during the American Revolution.

While the aboriginal chiefs aided the monarchs with their North American conflicts, affairs in Europe would also affect the dealings of the New World and, eventually, almost all of the French king's possessions in what was known as Canada were reinquished by him to the British Crown, providing Canada with one singular monarchy. But, this placement of French people under a British sovereign did not come without friction; the Acadians refused to affirm their allegiance to George III and insisted upon remining Catholic, leading to their deportation in what became known as the Great Upheaval.

The American Revolution

Following the Treaty of Paris, concluding the Seven Years' War, King George III issued the Royal Proclamation of 1763, setting the Appalachian Mountains as the division between the Thirteen Colonies, to the east, and "Indian Reserve", to the west. Being the first legal recognition by the British Crown of aboriginal rights, the document is today viewed as fundamental for First Nations land claims and self-government in Canada.

The Quebec Act—shaped by the views of the anti-assimilationist Governor of Quebec, Guy Carlton and supported by King George—was passed in 1774, by which the Crown guaranteed the continued free practice of Catholicism, as well as restored the French system of civil law for issues relating to private law. This originated the tradition of Canadian constitutional law protecting languistic, religious, and legal rights in Quebec.

The Royal Proclamation and Quebec Act were regarded by American colonists as two of the Intolerable Acts that eventually led to the outbreak of the American Revolution. But, the American hostility toward the spirit of those laws is what led most Québécois to rebuff the revolution; they fought, in provincial militas, alongside British soldiers repelling invasions by the republican revolutionaries. Others, though—especially the peasant habitants—aided the Americans.

The conflict resulted in some 46,000 United Empire Loyalists fleeing north from the United States, the King-in-Council granting each family  of land in his various colonies, mostly in Nova Scotia, but, also in Quebec and what is today Ontario and Manitoba. At the same time, approximately 3,000 former slaves of African ancestry, known as Black Loyalists, moved to the Maritimes and thousands of Iroquois and other aboriginals expelled from New York and other states resettled under the protection of the Crown in what is now Ontario. In all, so many arrived on the east coast that the colony of New Brunswick was split out of Nova Scotia for administrative purposes. Continuing today, Ontario residents descended from these original refugees retain the post-nominals UE, standing for United Empire.

The loyalists who settled in the Maritimes, however, found themselves among some residents aligned with the United States and its republican cause.

Royalty and rebellions
The Prince spent time in Newfoundland, Nova Scotia, and the Province of Quebec, being the first member of the royal family to visit the latter.

Four years later, William's brother, Prince Edward, served in Canada from 1791 until the turn of the 19th century on military duties and as Commander of British North American troops. The Prince lived at Quebec City and took a French-Canadian mistress, with whom it is speculated he had two children. In 1792, when a riot, fuelled by ethnic character,  broke out at a poll during the first elections for the Legislative Assembly of Lower Canada, Prince Edward said to the crowd, "part then in peace. I urge you to unanimity and accord. Let me hear no more of the odious distinctions of English and French. You are all His Britannic Majesty's beloved Canadian subjects." It was reportedly the first time the word Canadian was used to refer to all colonists, rather than only Francophones.

Edward also lived in Halifax, Nova Scotia, between 1794 and 1798 and, again, from 1799 to 1800, making a significant mark on the city through projects such as Fort George, the Halifax Town Clock, the Prince's Lodge, and St George's Church, which the King and Edward's brother, Prince Frederick, supported.

Prince Edward's only legitimate daughter, Victoria, was born on 24 May 1819, at Kensington Palace. However, Edward died shortly thereafter, leaving Victoria as heir to the throne until, upon the death of her uncle, William IV, she acceded as queen at the age of 18. Though she would never visit Canada, she received numerous Canadians in audience (especially her father's friends) and her image, thanks to the spread of newspapers and the invention of photography, was reproduced sufficiently to maintain popularity and loyalty in her colonies.

Insurrections against the Crown did still take place, though; notably the Rebellions of 1837, which had been stirred up by the rise in power and influence of the United States and republican sentiment. Of them, the Queen wrote in her diary, "the news are, I grieve to say, very bad from Canada; that is to say, rumours and reports by the papers; though, we have no official reports. But [Prime Minister] Lord Melbourne hopes it may not be so bad as it is rumoured. There certainly is open rebellion."

Most colonists did not espouse a break with the Crown and, in the wake of the disturbances, the Queen called on her people in Upper Canada to eschew vengeance on the perpetrators in favour of justice. A mark of her coronation, Victoria granted pardons to the rebels. Further, the British Parliament granted responsible government to the Canadas, with the support of Victoria herself, despite its decrease of the political influence in the colonies of both she and her representatives.

The first royal tours
Where royal influence was lessened, it increased in other areas; Canadians celebrated momentous moments in the Queen's life, such as her marriage to Prince Albert; royal events were inaugurated, such as the Queen's Plate, created with Queen Victoria's blessing in 1860; and, while she was monarch, Victoria's children and grandchildren would come to Canada as either the governor general or viceregal consort, or to undertake tours of the country that included meeting Canadians from a heterogeneity of communities and backgrounds and displaying local cultures.

The Queen's eldest son and heir, Prince Albert Edward (later King Edward VII) for four months toured the Maritimes and Province of Canada in 1860, laying the final stone of the Victoria Bridge in Montreal, setting the cornerstone of the parliament building in Bytown (today Ottawa), and officially opening Queen's Park in Toronto. At Dundurn Castle, in Hamilton, Albert Edward met with Allan MacNab, a former joint premier of the Province of Canada. In a twist of fate, the Prince's great-great-grandson, King Charles III, married Camilla Shand (now Queen Consort Camilla), the great-great-great-granddaughter of MacNab. The Prince also crossed the border to pay a visit to President of the United States James Buchanan at the White House.

Sectarian tensions were high in Canada at the time and Prince Albert Edward was cautioned not to do or say anything that might exacerbate the situation. The Duke of Newcastle, who accompanied the Prince, instructed the Mayor of Toronto to ensure Albert Edward's procession would not pass under any Orange Order arches. At Kingston, the Duke ordered the royal yacht not to dock, as the Orangemen had erected a welcoming arch on the pier, with an image of William of Orange on one side, and a depiction of the Prince of Wales (Albert Edward) with the anti-Catholic revolutionary Giuseppe Garibaldi on the other. Orangemen thereafter protested the Prince's steamer along part of its route.

Albert Edward was followed by his younger brother, Prince Alfred, who embarked on a five week tour of the Maritimes and the Province of Canada in 1861. The Montreal Gazette noted, "Prince Alfred drove quietly through the town, making purchases at several shops; and the people seeing him thus occupied with business, forebore to mob or interrupt him". The Prince visited the Tangier gold mines in Nova Scotia (Prince Alfred Arch, marking where the Prince stepped ashore, still standing in the town today) and, from Canada, he wrote a letter to his parents "in Native American style": on a piece of birch-bark he'd pulled from a tree that day.

Confederation and the early Dominion

Prior to the confederation of Canada, a number of issues were of prime concern in the deliberations on the amalgamation of four Canadian colonies into a country; most notably, the threat of invasion by the United States, especially considering that country's policy of Manifest Destiny. It was the explicit intention of the Fathers of Confederation to unite the disparate British entities in North America into a single state under a constitutional monarchy; at the 1864 Charlottetown Conference, the deligates, including those from Canada East (now Quebec), agreed unanimously that the new federation should have that form of government, the men seeing it as a balance between the autocracy of the Russian Empire and the popular sovereignty of the United States. The latter had just led to the American Civil War, which was seen as "the final stage in the discredit of [American] democracy and republicanism." A Canadian crown, the Fathers thought, would ensure diversity and racial harmony in Canada, thereby strengthening its legal and cultural sovereignty.

The Queen herself was a unifying influence not only for the Fathers, but, for the provinces, as well. She took personal interest in the project of Confederation, favouring the idea as a way to lower the costs of defence and improve relations with the United States. To the delegates from Nova Scotia to whom Victoria granted an audience, she said, “I take the deepest interest in [Confederation], for I believe it will make [the provinces] great and prosperous.” When the British North America Act, 1867, was passed in the Parliament in Westminster, the Queen said to John A. Macdonald, who was then in London, "I am very glad to see you on this mission [...] It is a very important measure and you have all exhibited so much loyalty.”

By the mid-1860s, neither the name nor the location of the capital of the hypothetical new union had been settled. On the former issue, various suggestions were put forward—including Victorialand, in honour of the Queen—but John A. Macdonald and then Governor General of the Province of Canada, the Viscount Monk, supported the name Kingdom of Canada, to "fix the monarchical basis of the constitution." The proposal, however, caused worries in the Foreign and Colonial Office in London that such a title would provoke the republican United States and a compromise term, dominion, was adopted instead. This new Dominion was formed by the British North America Act, 1867, to take effect on 1 July of that year. As it was Queen Victoria's royal assent that enacted the bill into law and she had taken such an interest in the endeavour of Confederation, she has since been dubbed the "Mother of Confederation".

The matter of which city would serve as the country's capital was left by the British North America Act, 1867, to be decided by the Queen. From a list that included various well-established cities in Upper and Lower Canada, Victoria chose the small community of Bytown (later renamed as Ottawa) on the grounds that it was defensible, located on a major waterway, and sat on the border between the two largest provinces of Canada, Quebec and Ontario. The buildings originally intended to house the parliament of the Province of Canada were also already in Bytown.

The new constitution vested in the Queen responsibility for peace, order, and good government, as D'Arcy McGee had desired. In practice, though, the Second Reform Act, 1867, and the emergence of a two-party system decreased Victoria's personal room for manoeuvre. Still, the ceremonial role for the monarchy remained unaltered and the first visit of a member of the royal family to the Dominion of Canada took place two years after its creation; the sovereign's second son, Prince Arthur, arrived for training with the Rifle Brigade based at Montreal. Arthur toured the country for eight weeks, was made a chief by the Iroquois of the Grand River Reserve, and, in 1870, attended a fancy-dress skaing carnival at Victoria Skating Rink in Montreal. Of the Prince, Lady Lisgar, wife of then Governor General of Canada the Lord Lisgar, noted in a letter to Victoria that Canadians seemed hopeful Prince Arthur would one day return as governor general.

In the same year, Rupert's Land was ceded to the Crown in Right of Canada from the Hudson's Bay Company, pulling it into the jurisdiction of the North-West Territories. This move sparked a Métis rebellion and the establishment by Louis Riel of a provisional republican government in the Red River Valley. Following negotiations with Riel's administration, the province of Manitoba was established in 1870 by the granting of royal assent to the Manitoba Act by Governor General the Earl of Dufferin.

A royal viceregal consort
After the death of her husband, Prince Albert, in 1861, Queen Victoria had gone into deep mourning and retreated from public life. As that situation carried on for over a decade, resentment toward the Queen grew in Britain, along with republican sentiment. But, because Victoria had never visited Canada, and therefore Canadians did not perceive of any change in her behaviour, the Queen's popularity remained high throughout the country. John Charles Dent wrote in 1880, "In Canada, loyalty has by no means degenerated into a mere feeble sentiment of expediency. Throughout the length and breadth of our land, the name of Queen Victoria is regarded with an affectionate love and veneration which is felt for no other human being.” In 1872, Canada celebrated a day of thanksgiving after Prince Albert Edward recovered from a near-fatal bout of typhoid.

As successor to Dufferin, rather than sending Prince Arthur to Canada as her representative, Queen Victoria, on the advice of her British Privy Council, appointed her son-in-law, John Campbell, Marquess of Lorne, in 1878. This meant that, for the first time, Rideau Hall would have a permanent royal resident: Victoria's fourth daughter, Princess Louise. When the news reached Canada that a daughter of the Queen would be viceregal consort of Canada, a "thrill of joy burst upon the Dominion"; it was felt the Princess would be a strong link between Canadians and their sovereign.

However, the couple were initially not received well by the Canadian press, which complained about the imposition of royalty on the country's hitherto un-regal society, something that was only exasperated by mishaps and misunderstandings and the resulting negative press horrified the Princess. Louise endeared herself by making clear she had no pretenses and, eventually, the worries about a rigid court at the Queen's Canadian residence turned out to be unfounded; the royal couple were found to be more relaxed than their predecessors, as demonstrated at the many Ice skating and tobogganing parties, balls, dinners, and other state occasions hosted by Lord Lorne and Princess Louise.

The pair also undertook extensive tours of the country; some with other members of the royal family, such as when the Princess' younger brother, Prince Leopold, visited and spent time with Louise and the Governor General at their cabin on the Gaspé Peninsula and Louise's nephew, Prince George (later King George V) travelled with the Lornes in 1883 to Ottawa, Toronto, and Niagara Falls. The royal couples' three-month visit to British Columbia in 1882 did much to reconcile the local inhabitants to Confederation. The Princess proved so popular that, when the Governor General announced that the route of the awaited transcontinental railway would pass through Kicking Horse Pass into what has since become Vancouver, rather than by the Yellowhead Pass to Bute Inlet, Premier Robert Beaven asked Lord Lorne whether it would be possible for Vancouver Island to become a separate kingdom with Princess Louise as queen. First Nations titled Lord Lorne as Great Brother-in-Law as he and Louise travelled across the Prairies.

Princess Louise and Lord Lorne made a number of lasting contributions to Canadian society, especially in the realm of the arts and sciences, including the establishment of the Royal Society of Canada, the Royal Canadian Academy of Arts, and the National Gallery of Canada. Louise was proficient in watercolour and oil painting, hanging many of her own works around Rideau Hall and painting sprigs of apple blossoms on doors along the palace's Monck wing corridor (one of which remains to the present), as well as overseeing the creation of the statue of Queen Victoria that stands on McGill University's campus. Various locations were named for her, including the province of Alberta, and the Princess herself gave the name Regina to the capital of Saskatchewan. In all, Louise made such an impression on Canadian life that, at her funeral, on 12 December 1939, her coffin was bourne by her own Canadian regiment, the Argyll and Sutherland Highlanders of Canada.

The end of Victoria's reign

In Queen Victoria's latter years, both her Golden and Diamond Jubilees—held in 1887 and 1897, respectively—were marked with great displays and public ceremonies in Canada. Victoria was the first of Canada's monarchs to reach those milestones. Thanksgiving holidays were held to celebrate the occasions. Prime Minister John A. Macdonald was in London for the Golden Jubilee and there, along with the premiers of the other Dominions, attended a conference that turned out to be the forerunner of the modern Commonwealth Heads of Government Meeting. The anniversary was monumentalized in Canada by the establishment of public service institutions, such as the Royal Jubilee Hospital in Victoria, British Columbia.

For the Diamond Jubilee in Britain, Prime Minister Wilfrid Laurier was invited and Canadian cavalrymen, five-abreast and followed by Laurier in a carriage, led the Dominions contingent of the royal procession through London on 22 June. The Toronto Grenadiers (today the Royal Regiment of Canada) and the Black Watch (Royal Highland Regiment) of Canada also took part. In Canada, a series of commemorative stamps, the first ever produced by the country, was issued on 19 June and streets were decorated in cities and towns to mark Accession Day and the 22 June public holiday, on which fêtes brought Canadians of different ethnicities together. On that day, the Queen sent a telegram to all the Dominions, the message arriving in Canada five minutes after being sent from Buckingham Palace. To Canadians, she wrote, “from my heart, I thank my beloved people. May God bless them." Led by the Marchioness of Aberdeen (then the viceregal consort of Canada), Canada’s gift to the Queen was the creation of the Victorian Order of Nurses, which still operates today. In contemporary popular culture, new songs were composed in the Queen’s honour and buildings named for her.

In between the jubilees, in December 1894, Prime Minister John Thompson died at Windsor Castle when there to be admitted by the Queen to the imperial Privy Council, being struck with a heart attack mere hours after the ceremony. Victoria, then aged and using a wheelchair, was wheeled into St George's Chapel, where Thompson lay-in-state, and placed a wreath on her former prime minister's coffin. This moment was captured in a painting by Frederic Bell-Smith, but the canvas was destroyed in the burning of the Centre Block in 1916.

Victoria herself died at Osborne House on 22 January 1901, after a reign lasting almost 64 years, and was succeeded by her eldest son, King Edward VII. Canada mourned the loss of Victoria; news "brought much of the country to a halt"; Church bells were rung for hours, gun salutes fired at Parliament Hill and armouries across the country, and concerts and social events were cancelled. The day of the funeral was a nationwide period of mourning, with the majority of businesses closed; Victorian mourning etiquette dictated Canadians continue to wear black clothes or armbands for up to three months following Victoria's death and black crepe was draped over public buildings. The Earl of Minto, then Governor General, and Wilfrid Laurier were at odds over which church in Ottawa should host the official memorial service for the late Queen; Minto favoured the Church of England cathedral, respecting the church to which Victoria had belonged, while Laurier and other ministers attended services of their own communion.

Due to the transatlantic telegraph cable, this was the first time Canadians would learn of their monarch's passing within minutes of it being announced in the United Kingdom. However, otherwise, the country's denizens had been mostly unaware of the Queen having been in poor health; the media and society around the royal family was taciturn regarding the sovereign's frailties. As such, upon hearing of Victoria's death, many Canadians double-checked with the cable dispaches posted on bulletin boards outside newspaper offices.

Victoria's long and popular reign resulted in many places being named in her honour and monuments to her, such as statues on Parliament Hill and throughout the provinces. The Queen's reign was permanently memorialized in Canada when, in the spring of 1901, it was decided by parliament that 24 May would continue as a holiday marking the late Queen's birthday, named as Victoria Day, to distinguish it from the King's birthday celebration to be held in November.

Twentieth century and the First World War
The end of Victoria's reign marked the beginning of a new century and one that would see Canada's rapid growth as a nation. As modern modes of transportation allowed for easier travel across the oceans, more of the royal family came to tour the King's northern Dominion. The first since Queen Victoria's death was Prince George (later King George V)—the son of the reigning king—returning to Canada in 1901, accompanied by his wife, the Duchess of Cornwall and York (later Quen Mary), and her brother, Prince Alexander of Teck (who would, in future, serve as governor genereal of Canada). Events during the royal tour, which took in the country between Quebec City and Victoria, had a more casual atmosphere than their equivalents in the United Kingdom; it was reported that, at one official dinner, the couple "shook hands with between two and three thousand guests, never appearing tired, but always manifesting signs of interest, bowing, and smiling to all presented to them."

The Prince returned only once more before he became king: when he visited in 1908, by then as Prince of Wales, to celebrate the tercentenary of Quebec City's founding. He reviewed the Canadian armed forces on the Plains of Abraham, in addition to presenting a cheque for 90,000 pounds to aid the federal Crown in purchasing the area of the plains so as to establish a park, which was opened on 17 March 1908. The Prince wrote to his father, “I hope my visit has done good, especially to improve the relations between the English and French Canadians, which have never been so good as they are now.” The governor general at the time, the Earl Grey, reported back to King Edward VII that the Prince "has taught the people of Quebec how to cheer."

Edward VII died two years later, which led to a period of official mourning, with numerous memorials, military parades, and tributes held across the country; the funeral day was made an official holiday. However, due to Edward's relatively short reign, his passing was not as impactful on Canadians as his mother's had been. Newspapers were more forthright in their coverage than they had been at the time of Victoria's death; they reported right away on Queen Alexandra's last moments with the King and some even pointed at Edward's smoking habit as a contributer to his demise.

Edward was succeeded by Prince George and Canada sent 700 dignitaries and military personnel to take part in the celebrations in London. In 1911, the King appointed his uncle, Prince Arthur, as governor general of Canada, thereby fulfilling the desire of Canadians earlier expressed by the Lady Lisgar and bringing Arthur back to Canada for a fourth time and as the first natural member of the royal family to serve as the Canadian federal viceroy. King George V was reported to have had much to do with the appointment. Arthur brought with him to Canada his wife, Princess Louise, and his youngest daughter, Princess Patricia, and the family travelled extensively across Canada, the Prince performing ceremonial tasks, such as in 1917 laying the cornerstone of the reconstructed federal parliament building. The royal couple made a concerted effort to contribute to the social life of the capital, using Rideau Hall as a major site for events for Canadians from across the country.

The Prince was, though, sometimes thought to have overstepped the still un-cemented bounds of constitutional monarchy in Canada, particularly in his carrying out of the ceremonial duties of the commander-in-chief during the First World War. Overall, though, Prince Arthur stressed the importance of Canadian military contributions, promoting training and readiness for Canadian troops, but also sought to enhance charity at home. To put this preaching into practice, the Duchess of Connaught, in addition to working for the Red Cross and other organisations, for Christmas in 1915 sent a card and a box of maple sugar to every Canadian serving overseas. She also had a knitting machine brought to Rideau Hall, which she used to make thousands of pairs of socks for soldiers. Prince Arthur was active in auxiliary war services and charities, conducted a number hospital visits, and, following the war, commissioned a stained glass window, located in St Bartholomew's Church, next to Rideau Hall, in memory of the Government House staff who lost their lives during the war.

The King and Queen called on Canadian troops stationed in the United Kingdom, as well as the nurses of Canada's Red Cross Hospital. The King often visited the Western Front on the European continent, meeting with members of the Canadian Expeditionary Force and touring Canadian field hospitals. General Arthur Currie was, in June 1917, knighted by the George V on the battlefield at Vimy Ridge. The King kept up correspondence with Prince Arthur, discussing conditions on the home front in Canada. To deflect anti-German feelings away from the monarchy, George V issued in 1917 letters patent changing the name of the royal house from Saxe-Coburg and Gotha (established when Queen Victoria married Prince Albert) to Windsor and stripping German royal titles from anyone in the royal family who had them, such as his wife, who was a princess of Teck, and her brother, Prince Alexander, who took the surname Cambridge and became the Earl of Athlone.

At the end of 1916, Prince Arthur publicly expressed his regret at having to leave Canada, as he and his family had grown very comfortable there. The royal family left a legacy behind them: Port Arthur (now part of Thunder Bay, Ontario) was named in honour of the Prince, who also gave his name to the Connaught Cup for pistol marksmanship of recruits in the Royal North-West Mounted Police. In addition, Princess Patricia's Canadian Light Infantry was created in 1914 and the Princess was herself eventually appointed by the King as colonel-in-chief of the regiment on 22 February 1918; an appointment she held until her death. It was during her time in Rideau Hall that Patricia met her future husband, Alexander Ramsay, who was then acting as aide-de-camp to her father.

Interwar period

After the end of the war, Prince Edward, Prince of Wales (later King Edward VIII), toured Canada in 1919, opening the third session of the 13th Canadian Parliament, amongst other duties performed when he had not disappeared to attend dances or to play golf, instead. He proved very popular with Canadians, though; when, in Toronto, he was greeted with enthusiasm by a crowd of soldiers just returned from Europe after the end of the war, who lifted Edward off his horse and "passed him, like a football, over their heads," and a veteran approached the Prince and casually said: "put it there, Ed." From that point on Edward shook hands with anyone who approached him, to the point where his right hand "became so black, swollen and painful from the continued enthusiastic handshaking that, in his own words, he 'retired it temporarily from Imperial service, and offered the left instead." Edward returned to Ottawa to lay the foundation stone of the Peace Tower before returning to the United Kingdom. Canada proved popular with the Prince as well; he purchased the  E.P. Ranch near Pekisko, High River, in Alberta; Edward held this ranch, and stayed at it numerous times, before selling it in 1962, a decade before his death.

Events took place in 1926 that would set the course for a dramatic shift in the role of the federal viceroy and ultimately result in the creation of a distinct monarchy for Canada. Until that point, the governor general remained a representative in Canada of the British government—the King in his British Council—but was still able to exercise the royal prerogative over the Canadian prime minister without orders from the King acting on the advice of his British ministers back in Westminster. After the Governor General at the time, the Lord Byng of Vimy, did just that and independently decided to refuse the advice of his Canadian Prime Minister, William Lyon Mackenzie King, to dissolve Parliament, thus forcing Mackenzie King to resign in what came to be known as the King–Byng Affair, the latter was, once reappointed following that year's general election, motivated to raise at the 1926 Imperial Conference questions about the relationship between the Dominions and the United Kingdom.

The premiers were mostly receptive and, following the close of the meeting, the Balfour Declaration was issued, which stated that the Dominions of the Crown were to be considered equal to the United Kingdom, as Mackenzie King had wished. The governor general of Canada, as with all the other governors-general of the Empire, would be the direct, personal representative of the King, rather than a diplomatic channel between the Canadian and British governments.

The first evocation of these concepts in statute law was seen in 1927. Passed by the British Parliament, the Royal and Parliamentary Titles Act altered part of the King's title to reflect his new status as monarch of each Dominion individually, rather than as king of the United Kingdom throughout all countries. Then, in 1931—following deliberations involving Canada's delegation, led by Minister of Justice and Attorney General of Canada Ernest Lapointe—the notions of independence and equality were manifested in the Statute of Westminster's legal end to the Westminster Parliament's ability to legislate for the Dominions without the expressed request and consent of the latter. As a result, laws outlining the succession—notably, the Act of Settlement, 1701—as pertaining to Canada, were now under the control of the Canadian Parliament and the King could only be advised on Canadian affairs by his Canadian ministers; the monarchy of Canada had "assumed its full constitutional meaning." This had widespread support from Quebec's political elite, as along with its own Crown, Canada gained control over it's foreign policy and became distinct from the United Kingdom and its empire.

Through 1927, King George V and his consort, Queen Mary, opened Canada House in London and the King's sons, Princes Edward and George, unveiled the Laurier monument on Parliament Hill and dedicated the Princes' Gates and opened Union Station in Toronto, after which Edward went to Alberta to spend time on his ranch.

Though the Canadian Cabinet had in 1930 suggested to the King that he appoint his other son, Prince Albert, Duke of York, as governor general of Canada, both George V and the Duke were hesitant; the latter had two young daughters—a toddler (later Queen Elizabeth II) and a newborn (Princess Margaret)—and the former wished that Albert remain close to compensate for the behaviour of the Prince of Wales. As the Statute of Westminster had not yet been implemented, the British Cabinet eventually advised against the Canadian idea and, instead, recommended the Earl of Bessborough as viceroy. This, though. was ultimately because the Lord Passfield, then the Minister for the Dominions, thought that, despite the request directly from their government, Canadians disliked the royal family. As Albert eventually went on to become King George VI, had the Canadian Privy Council's idea been accepted, a Canadian governor general who represented the King would have gone on to become king of Canada himself.

Canadians (and the Commonwealth as a whole) heard in 1932 the first Royal Christmas Message, as read by George V, who, three years later, celebrated his Silver Jubilee. The euphoria was short lived, however, as the King died on 20 January 1936. Announcements were made over radio; but, then the broadcasters fell silent for the rest of the night out of respect. Through the following week, courthouses were shut, the Legislative Assembly of Ontario delayed the opening of its new session so members of provincial parliament could recite new oaths of allegiance, and the University of Toronto cancelled social events (though, not classes). On 28 January, the day pf the late King's funeral, the Governor General issued a proclamation encouraging Canadians to attend church services and for Crown-owned buildings to be draped in black crepe.

The hope that surrounded the accession of Prince Edward as King Edward VIII did not, as with Edward's reign, survive the year. However, Edward was the first monarch of Canada to accede to the country's throne by Canada's own laws and, as such, it was deemed "constitutionally inappropriate" for Canada's (and the other Dominions') accession proclamations to be approved by a British order-in-council. Early into his time as monarch, Edward, in July 1936, took his only foreign trip as sovereign, to unveil the Canadian National Vimy Memorial in France, in his capacity as the king of Canada.

Abdication and the king of Canada comes home

Despite his popularity in Canada and elsewhere when he was Prince of Wales, the new King's relationship with the twice-divorced, American socialite Wallis Simpson caused serious concern; more so among Canadians, who were more familiar with the personal life of their sovereign than the populace of the UK, due to the British press imposing on itself a ban on publishing the exploits of the King and Simpson that the American newspapers did not. Governor General the Lord Tweedsmuir conveyed to Buckingham Palace and British Prime Minister Stanley Baldwin his observations of Canadians' deep affection for the King; but, also the outrage towards Canadian puritanism—both Catholic and Protestant—that would occur if Edward VIII married a divorcée. Further, the Cabinet telegrammed the King, urging him to place his duty as sovereign above his feelings for Simpson. As popular anger mounted in tandem with the imminence of a marriage between Edward and Simpson, the King's prime ministers sought solutions to the crisis. Mackenzie King, along with the other Dominion first ministers, rejected the ideas of either a royal or morganatic marriage taking place. This left only Edward's abdication as the final option.

Edward VIII renounced his Canadian Crown on 10 December, giving, with the consent of his Canadian ministers, royal assent to His Majesty's Declaration of Abdication Act 1936. Consequently, his brother, Prince Albert, became Canada's king, choosing the regnal name George VI. A proclamation of accession was drafted by the Cabinet and read by the Prime Minister as a radio broadcast. The Canadian Parliament later passed the Succession to the Throne Act, 1937, to ratify the abdication into Canadian law and demonstrate Canada's independence from the United Kingdom. Mackenzie King wrote in his diary just before the abdication that he had "no fears about Canada [...] [I]n all probability, with the Duke and Duchess of York as king and queen, and with the little Princess Elizabeth in the picture, there will be a much happier situation in the new year than there has been at any time since the time of George V."

In an effort to foster Canadian identity, Tweedsmuir conceived in 1937 of a royal tour by the monarch, so that, through seeing "their king performing royal functions, supported by his Canadian ministers," Canadians might be made more aware of their country's status as an independent kingdom. Mackenzie King agreed with this notion; though, he also felt, along with officials in the United Kingdom, that the trip would have an element of public relations: the presence of the King and Queen, in both Canada and the United States, was calculated to shore up sympathy for Britain in anticipation of hostilities with Nazi Germany. Thus, Tweedsmuir put the suggestion to the King and the Prime Minister, while in London for the coronation in May 1937, formally consulted with George on the matter. More than a year later, the King agreed. Officials in the Dominions Office in London, however, resisted the reality of a separate role for George VI as Canada's sovereign.

On 17 May 1939, the king of Canada, accompanied by his royal consort, Queen Elizabeth, sailed up to Quebec City on the Canadian Pacific liner RMS Empress of Australia, escorted by two destroyers and two cruisers of the Royal Canadian Navy. George stepped ashore at Wolfe's Cove, becoming the first reigning sovereign of Canada to set foot on Canadian soil. The reaction by the public was positive beyond expectation and, from the start, it was noted that the King was present as Canada's sovereign; a newspaper at the time stated, "the King of Canada walked yesterday, as he walks today, among his own. There can be welcomes elsewhere in Canada equal to his reception in Quebec. None will surpass it."

Of the King and Queen's arrval Rideau Hall, on 20 May, official royal tour historian Gustave Lanctot wrote, "when Their Majesties walked into their Canadian residence, the Statute of Westminster had assumed full reality: the king of Canada had come home." While in the nation's capital, George set to carrying out his royal duties, including receiving the new American envoy to Canada, granting royal assent to nine bills passed by Parliament, and ratifying treaties, while the Queen laid the cornerstone of the Supreme Court of Canada building. The King presided over celebrations on Parliament Hill for his official birthday in Canada—the first time this had been marked in the presence of the sovereign himself—and he dedicated the National War Memorial. It was there that the King and Queen conducted the first-ever royal walkabout: rather than return to their motorcade at the end of the official ceremony, George and Elizabeth spent half an hour mingling casually among the 25,000 veterans, who were part of a crowd of some 100,000 people. The act was remarkable, as, at the time, royalty was generally perceived to be distant. Tweedsmuir captured the importance of the moment:  "One old fellow said to me, 'aye, man, if Hitler could just see this.' It was wonderful proof of what a people's king means."

While travelling on the Royal Train to the west coast and back, meeting thousands of Canadians along the way (by the end of the first week alone, two million of Canada's 11 million inhabitants had turned out to see the royal couple), the King, from Government House in Winnipeg, Manitoba, delivered the Empire Day speech by radio to the Dominions and Britain and its colonies; met with the Îyârhe Nakoda outside of Calgary, Alberta; and presented the King's Colour to his Royal Canadian Navy in Victoria, British Columbia. During the return leg, the King and Queen also conducted, between 7 and 10 June, a state visit on behalf of Canada to the United States. The royal couple then returned to Canada, touring the Maritimes and the still separate Dominion of Newfoundland.

The Second World War and the resident monarchies

Only five months after the departure of George VI and his wife from Canada, Britain declared war on Nazi Germany. The King did so as King of the United Kingdom on 3 September 1939, but, as king of Canada, was not advised by his Canadian ministers to do the same until 10 September. Mackenzie King and Minister of Justice Ernest Lapointe initially argued that Canada was bound by Britain's declaration of war. However, after it was realised that Canada was absent from the list of belligerent states in President of the United States Franklin D. Roosevelt's declaration of neutrality, Parliament was summoned by the Governor General on 7 September and approved of Canada's need to defend itself. These were significant developments, as they became examples for other Dominions to follow, and, by the war's end, F.R. Scott concluded, "it is firmly established as a basic constitutional principle that, so far as relates to Canada, the King is regulated by Canadian law and must act only on the advice and responsibility of Canadian ministers."

Governor General the Lord Tweedsmuir died in February 1940, while still viceroy, and so an uncle of George VI, the Earl of Athlone, was appointed to the post, requiring he and his wife, Princess Alice (a granddaughter of Queen Victoria), and Athlone's Aide-de-Camp, Alastair Windsor, Earl of Macduff (the grandson of previous Governor General Prince Arthur), to make the trans-oceanic journey in the midst of the ongoing Battle of the Atlantic. The Governor General and Princess Alice became supporters of the Canadian war effort; Alice was appointed Honorary Commandant of a number of women's military services, such as the Women's Royal Canadian Naval Service and the Royal Canadian Air Force Women's Division, while Athlone travelled extensively throughout the country in an effor to spread the message that King George VI was dedicated to fighting totalitarianism. The royal couple hosted the Quebec Conferences in 1943 and 1944, wherein Mackenzie King, Roosevelt, and British Prime Minister Winston Churchill decided the strategies of the western allies that would lead to victory over Nazi Germany and Japan in 1945.

As the war threatened the royal family, plans were formed for the King, Queen, and their two children to reside for the duration of the conflict at Hatley Castle, in Colwood, British Columbia, which the King in his federal Council had purchased for use as a royal palace. It was, however, eventually settled that morale in the United Kingdom would be seriously diminished should the King abandon the European front and, so, the royal family would remain in London and Windsor. From there, Canada's monarch and his family engaged with Canadian militia, navy, and airmen and women. For example, to the first men from the 1st Canadian Division to arrive in the UK from Halifax, Nova Scotia, on 16 December 1939, the King wrote, “the British Army will be proud to have as comrades-in-arms the successors of those who came from Canada in the Great War and fought with a heroism that has never been forgotten.” Ahead of the Normandy landings on 6 June 1944, the King, along with his Canadian Prime Minister, inspected the formations that were to be sent across the English Channel, including 1st Canadian Parachute Battalion and the 3rd Canadian Division. With the Queen, George inspected the 1st Canadian Division at Aldershot on 8 June. Travelling incognito as “General Coilingwood”, the King visited Canadian units in Italy's Volturno Valley in August 1944, there presenting Major John Keefer Mahony with the Victoria Cross.

Prince George, Duke of Kent (the King's brother), visited air bases and training centres across Canada; Queen Elizabeth made an appeal to Canadian women to contribute to the war efforts; and her daughter, Princess Elizabeth (later Queen Elizabeth II), in 1940, posed for her first official Canadian portrait. With her parents, the Princess visited Canadian service personnel stationed in the United Kingdom and undertook solo duties, such as reviewing a parade of Canadian airwomen in 1945. Two years following, she was appointed by her father as Colonel-in-Chief of Le Régiment de la Chaudière and the 48th Highlanders of Canada, her first appointments in the Canadian military and which she held until her death in 2022. While Mackenzie King was speaking with the King at Buckingham Palace on 23 October 1945, the Princess said she was prepared to shoot the German Führer, Adolf Hitler, if given the chance.

Canada was also home to foreign royalty in exile during the war, many of whom resided at Rideau Hall. Among the royal guests were Crown Prince Olav and Crown Princess Martha of Norway; Grand Duchess Charlotte and Prince Felix of Luxembourg; King Peter II of Yugoslavia; King George II of Greece; Empress Zita of Austria and her daughters; as well as Queen Wilhelmina of the Netherlands, her daughter Princess Juliana, and granddaughters Princesses Beatrix and Irene. While in Ottawa, Juliana gave birth to her third daughter, Margriet, at the Civic Hospital, where the delivery room was temporarily declared as extraterritorial soil to ensure that the Princess would have only Dutch nationality.

Dawn of the second Elizabethan age
Mackenzie King's diary traces Princess Elizabeth's deepening involvement in national affairs as she grew into her 20s. He noted, for instance, conversing with the Princess about Canada at an official dinner for Commonwealth heads of government on 1 May 1944 and her presence at a meal, on 24 May 1946, during which the Prime Minister discussed with the King the case of Igor Gouzenko, a Russian spy who had defected to Canada; though Mackenzie King noted George's awareness of many details about the matter, the Prime Minister recorded that he sent the King a copy of Gouzenko's confession.

On 9 July 1947, Mackenzie King received both notice of Princess Elizabeth's wish to marry Philip Mountbatten and a request for the Canadian Privy Council's approval, as required by the Royal Marriages Act, 1772. The Cabinet (as a quorum of the Privy Council) gave its blessing and the Princess married Philip (made Duke of Edinburgh on the wedding day) in November of the same year, in a ceremony that attracted the attention of Canadians hungry for good news after the dark years of the war. The King-in-Council presented the newlyweds with a canoe and Elizabeth with a mink-fur coat (which she wore while in Canada for decades after).

The Duke and Duchess of Edinburgh toured Canada from coast-to-coast-and-back in late 1951. With her, the Princess brought a draft accession proclamation, in case the King, who was already ill at the time, should die while Elizabeth was in Canada. Among the many activities the royal couple took part in, they attended their first hockey game at Maple Leaf Gardens in Toronto and enjoyed a square dance at Rideau Hall. The Princess and Philip also crossed into the United States to pay an official visit to President Harry S. Truman, who greeted Elizabeth as a "Canadian princess" at the reception she hosted at the Canadian embassy in Washington, DC.

Having suffered for some time with lung cancer, George VI eventually failed to recover from a pneumonectomy and died of a coronary thrombosis in his sleep on 6 February 1952, at Sandringham House, while Princess Elizabeth was in Kenya. The monarch's passing—which, despite his health, still caught Canadians off-guard—was communicated via cable between the late King's Private Secretary, Alan Lascelles, and Thibaudeau Rinfret, who was acting as Administrator of the Canadian government between the departure of Governor General the Earl of Tunis and the swearing-in of Tunis' replacement, Vincent Massey, who was in London at the time; the telegram read, "profoundly regret to state that His Majesty King George the Sixth passed away peacefully in his sleep early this morning." Rinfret immediately issued on the same day a proclamation of the King's death and the accession of Elizabeth II as Canada's queen, making Canada the first place in which this was done; her proclamation of accession for the United Kingdom was not read out until the following day, after which the new monarch met with her British Privy Council for the first time, with Massey in attendance.

With intercontinental air travel having become easier, a number of the new Queen's Canadian ministers flew to London to join Governor General-designate Vincent Massey at the funeral in London. The Prime Minister remained in Ottawa to take part in a wreath-laying ceremony on Parliament Hill. The date was not designated as a statutory holiday in all provinces, however; in others, it was left to the municipalities or businesses to decide whether or not to close for the day and not all did. As televisions were still a rarity in Canada, most listened to the funeral service in London by radio broadcast.

Wearing a gown that was, along with the floral emblems of the other countries of the Commonwealth, embroidered with Canada's maple leaf in green silk and gold bullion thread veined with crystal, the Queen was crowned at Westminster Abbey on 2 June 1953, in a ceremony that included, like the Queen's dress, Canadian symbols and participants. The prime ministers and leading citizens of Canada were present in the abbey, among representatives of other Commonwealth and foreign states, and the ceremony was also, at the Queen's request, broadcast around the world on television; three times as the event carried on, Royal Air Force Canberra jet bombers flew film footage of the coronation to Canada for play on the Canadian Broadcasting Corporation, making the first ever non-stop flights between the United Kingdom and the Canadian mainland. Guests at the ceremony, television viewers, and radio listeners heard Elizabeth swear a revised Coronation Oath, wherein she reaffirmed her dedication expressed earlier in South Africa and swore to "govern the peoples of [...] Canada [...] according to their respective laws and customs." The separate mention of Canada mirrored the granting of royal assent, the day previous, to the Royal Style and Titles Act, which gave Elizabeth a distinctly Canadian title.

During a tour of Canada in 1957, the Queen made her first-ever live appearance on television, appointed her husband to her Canadian Privy Council at a meeting of which she chaired, and, on 14 October, opened the first session of the 23rd parliament; some 50,000 people descended on Parliament Hill to witness the arrival of the monarch, though, due to the financial austerity of the times, the pageantry was muted in comparison to what would be seen at a similar event in the United Kingdom. Elizabeth and her husband, accompanied by Canadian Prime Minister, John Diefenbaker, as the Queen's senior minister in attendance, also, on behalf of Canada, paid a state visit to the United States, attending the 350th anniversary of the founding of Jamestown, Virginia, and meeting with President Dwight D. Eisenhower at the White House.

Elizabeth met the President again two years later, at the official opening of the Saint Lawrence Seaway. As she made her way through a full tour of Canada, at the end of which she chaired a meeting in Halifax of her Canadian Privy Council and personally appointed Georges Vanier as her representative in Canada, the Queen crossed the border twice to pay a visit to the United States, stopping in Chicago and Washington. Again, Diefenbaker was her chief minister in attendance; the Prime Minister was insistent that it be made clear to Americans that Elizabeth was visiting them as the Canadian monarch and that it was "the Canadian embassy and not the British Embassy officials who are in charge" of the Queen's itinerary. In this vein, the Queen's speeches in Chicago, written by her Canadian ministers, stressed steadily the fact that she had come to call as Queen of Canada and she hosted the return dinner for Eisenhower at the Canadian Embassy in Washington. Elizabeth also did her part to assist in entrenching the newly emerging Canadian character, ensuring that the Red Ensign (then Canada's national flag) be flown on the Royal Yacht and she stood to attention for the duration of each playing of "O Canada", the country's then still unofficial national anthem, sometimes even joining in the singing.

What was unknown to all, besides Elizabeth herself, including Diefenbaker until he was confided in at Kingston, Ontario, was that the Queen was, at the time, pregnant with her third child. Though her Prime Minister urged her to cut the tour short, Elizabeth swore him to secrecy and continued the journey, leaving the public announcement of the upcoming birth until she returned to London.

Turbulent decades

The 1960s was a decade of swift change in terms of both politics and technology and Canada's monarch found herself affected by both; for instance, Elizabeth II inaugurated the first trans-Atlantic telephone cable—part of one laid to link all the Commonwealth countries—when she, at Buckingham Palace, called Prime Minister Diefenbaker, who was at the Château Laurier. However, the Queen's success in the other field was not as guaranteed; shifts were taking place in Canadian identity, due, in part, to the establishment of multiculturalism as an official policy, increased immigration from beyond the British Isles, and Quebec separatism, the latter becoming the major impetus of political controversy over the Crown.

Those involved with the Quebec sovereignty movement saw the monarchy as a symbol of federalism and/or the British aspects of Canada's history and publicly displayed their contempt for the institution on a few occasions: At the height of the Quiet Revolution, the Quebec press reported that extreme separatists were plotting to assassinate the Queen during her upcoming 1964 tour of the province, as well as to kidnap Premier Jean Lesage's son, should the Queen come to Quebec. Despite fears for the monarch's safety and talk of cancelling the trip, Prime Minister Lester Pearson assured the Queen nothing much would come of the threats, the sovereign arrived as planned and, in a speech delivered, in both French and English, to the Legislative Assembly of Quebec on 10 October, she spoke of Canada's two "complementary cultures" and the strength of Canada's two founding peoples; she stated, "I am pleased to think that there exists in our Commonwealth a country where I can express myself officially in French [...] Whenever you sing [the French words of] "O Canada", you are reminded that you come of a proud race." However, as her motorcade passed through Quebec City, the route was lined with Quebecers showing their backs to her; others booed her and shouted separatist slogans. Though the protesters were the minority in the crowds gathered to see the Queen (the Montreal Gazette reporting that those who opposed the visit were students numbering in the hundreds), the provincial police violently dispersed those demonstrators who took to marching through the streets following Elizabeth's address to the Legislative Assembly, arresting 36, including some who had been there to show loyalty to the Queen. Elizabeth's "calmness and courage in the face of the violence" was noted. Ben Pimlott wrote in his biography of Elizabeth II that "the public reaction in Quebec, and the lack of it elsewhere, led Pearson—who had initiated the visit in the first place—to warn the Queen that the monarchy’s days in the Dominion were numbered."

Despite calls by the Toronto Star for a move to a republic as a mark of Canada's centennial, Elizabeth, accompanied by Prince Philip, presided over the main celebration of the event, taking part in a ceremony on Parliament Hill and touring Expo 67, which had also been visited by her sister, Princess Margaret. Philip opened the Pan American Games in Winnipeg later in July.

A constitutional conference was held in Ottawa in February 1968, at which the delegates from Quebec indicated that a provincial president might suit the province better than the lieutenant governor, but the proposal was not accepted, the overall feeling being that the monarchy "has served us well and that its reform has no great priority in the present round of constitutional changes." Still, during constitutional talks 10 years later, alterations to the Crown were put back on the table by the Cabinet of Pierre Trudeau, which proposed that the governor general be made full head of state and renamed as First Canadian. The provincial premiers, including Quebec's, reacted strongly against these suggestions.

Over the same period, references to the monarch and the monarchy were slowly removed from the public eye. For instance, while a number of royal symbols did remain and new ones, like the monarch's royal standard, were created, the Queen's portrait was seen less and less in public schools, the federal government adopted a corporate identity program without royal insignia, the Royal Mail became Canada Post, and the Royal Canadian Navy and Royal Canadian Air Force were merged, along with the army, into the Canadian Armed Forces. Of the changes made, it was said, "the Crown was to be rooted in the future, not the past; for the historic Crown, with its anthem, emblems, and symbolism, made accessible a past the government of the day rejected," a policy never to be discussed, either publicly or at constitutional conferences, following the rejoinder to Trudeau's 1978 constitutional amendments. John Fraser called it "the process of gradual attrition".

These moves, in combination with the Cabinet's constitutional tinkering and the Prime Minister's antics and breaches of protocol in the presence of the monarch, fostered suspicion that Trudeau harboured republican notions; it was rumoured by Paul Martin Sr. that the Queen was worried the Crown "had little meaning for him." In response to Trudeau's attitude towards the monarchy, the Monarchist League of Canada was founded in 1970 to maintain and promote Canada's status as a constitutional monarchy.

When Prince Edward, Duke of Windsor (the former King Edward VIII), died on 28 May 1972, Canada's diplomats in the United Kingdom attended the lying-in-state at Windsor. In Canada, the official gestures of mourning were minimal: Governor General Roland Michener and Prime Minister Pierre Trudeau sent condolonces to the Queen, Edward's niece, and Parliament passed a motion expressing the sympathy of members. None of these messages mentioned the Duke's previous role as King; they simply referred to his times in Canada when Prince of Wales.

Elizabeth toured the country a number of times during the decade. That which was undertaken in 1970—involving the Queen, the Duke of Edinburgh, Prince Charles, and Princess Anne—to mark the centennials of the creation of the Northwest Territories and of Manitoba, was also intended, by way of the monarch's presence in Inuvik and Tuktoyaktuk, to assert Canadian sovereignty over the north, which was then being questioned by the United States. In 1973, the Queen and Prince Philip travelled to Charlottetown to celebrate centennial of Prince Edward Island and to Regina for the 100th anniversary of the establishment of the Royal Canadian Mounted Police. At the same time she, on Trudeau's advice, attended that year's Commonwealth Heads of Government Meeting—the first held on Canadian soil—initiating the tradition of the monarch attending such conferences, no matter the location. Three years later, Trudeau also, at the urging of Premier of Quebec Robert Bourassa, advised the Queen to open the Olympics in Montreal, which were attended by no less than six other members of the royal family: the Duke of Edinburgh, Mark Phillips, Prince Edward, Prince Andrew, Prince Charles, and Princess Anne, who competed in the games for the United Kingdom. Then, the following year, the Queen, accompanied by her husband, returned to undertake a coast-to-coast circuit marking her Silver Jubilee.

Though she decided against suggestions that she allow Prince Charles to attend university in Canada, for worry that he would be hounded by the press, in 1978, Prince Andrew was back in Canada to attend Lakefield College School for a semester, as part of a Round Square exchange programme, and he, too, was presented with a canoe by Elizabeth's Canadian Cabinet.

An independent kingdom

As the Queen consented to her representative in Canada undertaking more of her duties, it became common practice for the governor general to represent the Queen and Canada abroad on state visits; two successive governors general undertook 12 state and working visits, and Elizabeth performed one, herself, through the 1980s, whereas there had been only three through the 1970s and none the decade before that.

On 29 July 1981, with the required approval of the Queen's Privy Council for Canada, Prince Charles married Lady Diana Spencer in a wedding that attracted the attention of millions of Canadians. The ceremony was attended by Governor General Edward Schreyer and, echoing the gift presented to the Queen and Prince Philip upon their wedding in 1947, Trudeau commissioned a hand built canoe as the Cabinet's gift for the royal couple. Diana proved more popular with Canadians than the Prince of Wales; it was noted by a former member of Charles' household that, during a 1983 tour of the country, when the Prince emerged from the car, there would be groans, but cheers for Diana when she was seen. Charles' aunt, Princess Margaret, also received negative attention when, in 1981, her visit to the Royal Highland Fusiliers of Canada in Cambridge, Ontario, as their Colonel-in-Chief, was targeted by Irish nationalist protesters. At one of the ceremonies, which were boycotted by three city councillors, there was a scare when a gun barrel was thought to have been seen in the gathered crowd. But, it proved to be a mistake.

At the same time, the government was approaching a final resolution on the constitutional issues of the past decades. In 1981, Paul Martin Sr, John Roberts, and Mark MacGuigan were sent to the UK to discuss the patriation project; Martin noted that the Queen had taken a great interest in the constitutional debate and the three found the monarch "better informed on both the substance and politics of Canada's constitutional case than any of the British politicians or bureaucrats." Elizabeth continued to assist with the project until a conclusion was reached the following year, when, in Ottawa on 17 April, she proclaimed the Constitution Act, 1982, into force, which, among other changes and additions, patriated the constitution, making it fully Canadian law, and entrenched the monarchy in Canada; any change to the position of the monarch or the viceroys thenceforth required the consent of the federal and all 10 provincial legislatures. Trudeau commented in his memoir, "I always said it was thanks to three women that we were eventually able to reform our constitution[, including] the Queen, who was favourable [...] I was always impressed not only by the grace she displayed in public at all times, but by the wisdom she showed in private conversation."

However, the terms under which the constitution was patriated had not been agreed to by the Cabinet of Quebec, headed by Premier René Lévesque, a move that was viewed by Quebec sovereigntists as a betrayal. The Queen, aware this was the first time in Canadian history that a major constitutional change had been made without the agreement of the Quebec government, privately expressed to journalists her regret that Quebec was not part of the settlement.

In 1987, after the first agreements were reached among the 11 prime ministers in Canada on the Meech Lake Accord—which attempted to bring Quebec governmental support to the patriated constitution by introducing further amendments—the Queen made a rare foray into political matters when she publicly expressed on 22 and 23 October her personal support for the plan. She received criticism from opponents of the accord and Pierre Trudeau did not arrive for an official lunch with the Queen on 24 October. Also in 1987, Prince Andrew toured Canada with, for the first time, his wife, Sarah, Duchess of York, who proved popular with Canadians and relaxed among them. The royal couple spent 18 days canoeing through the Canadian north and the Duchess later reminisced that "Canada is like my second home." She also revealed in 2009 that, sometime during her marriage to the Duke of York, he had been offered the position of governor general of Canada; the couple agreed to decline and the Duchess speculated in hindsight that the choice may have ultimately been a contributing factor in their eventual divorce in 1996. The idea had also been floated that Canada abandon its status as a Commonwealth realm but retain a separate monarchy with Prince Andrew as king of Canada; this proposal, too, was never pursued.

The Queen undertook another tour of Canada in 1990, a trip originally planned for her to put the royal sign-manual to the constitutional amendment that would have implemented the Meech Lake Accord's plans, including recognising Quebec to be a distinct society. The accord, however, had failed, which inspired fears for the unity of Canada. At Canada Day celebrations on Parliament Hill, Elizabeth addressed the crowds, stating, "it is my fondest wish [...] that Canadians come together and remain together [...] I and members of my family have been with you on many special days in the life of this country [...] Canada is a country that has been blessed beyond most countries in the world. It is a country worth working for."

Despite the Queen's pleas, nationalism in Quebec gained vigour and another referendum on departure from Canada was held in 1995. Five days before the vote, the monarch was tricked into speaking, in both French and English, for 14 minutes with Pierre Brassard, a DJ for Radio CKOI-FM Montreal, who was pretending to be Elizabeth's Prime Minister, Jean Chrétien. When told that the separatists were showing a lead, the Queen revealed that she felt the "referendum may go the wrong way," adding, "if I can help in any way, I will be very happy to do so." However, she pointedly refused to accept the advice that she intervene on the issue without first seeing a draft speech sent by Chrétien. Overall, her tactful handling of the call won plaudits from the DJ who made it and the real Chrétien later, in his memoir, recounted the Queen's tongue-in-cheek comments to him regarding the affair: "'I didn't think you sounded quite like yourself,' she told me. 'But, I thought, given all the duress you were under, you might have been drunk.'" On 30 October, the day of the referendum, Queen Elizabeth was on her way to a Commonwealth Heads of Government Meeting in New Zealand and asked her pilot to remain at Los Angeles International Airport until the final tally from Quebec had been announced.

Peter Donolo, Chrétien's press secretary, leaked on 18 December 1998 that staff in the Prime Minister's Office and other Liberal Party members were working on a plan to abolish the monarchy by the turn of the millennium, though this was denied by Chrétien himself and disapproved of by the majority of incumbent provincial premiers. Save for some journalists, such as Lawrence Martin, who broke the story, the idea was also roundly denounced in the media.

The new millennium

The Queen and her husband undertook a 12-day tour of the country in 2002, to mark Elizabeth's Golden Jubilee and thousands turned out to the various occasions. The royal couple stopped in Iqaluit, Victoria, Vancouver, Winnipeg, Toronto, Hamilton, Hull, Fredericton, Sussex, Moncton, and Ottawa. In the capital of Nunavut, Elizabeth addressed the new Legislative Assembly, stating, "I am proud to be the first member of the Canadian royal family to be greeted in Canada's newest territory." In Vancouver, on 6 October, the Queen, accompanied by Wayne Gretzky, and in front of a crowd of 18,000 at General Motors Place, dropped the ceremonial first puck for the National Hockey League exhibition game between the Vancouver Canucks and San Jose Sharks—the first time any reigning monarch, Canadian or otherwise, had performed the task—and, in Saskatchewan, she unveilied a bronze equestrian statue of herself riding the Royal Canadian Mounted Police horse, Burmese. At an official dinner at the Canadian Museum of Civilization in Gatineau, Quebec, the Queen said, "[I wish] to express my profound gratitude to all Canadians [...] for the loyalty, encouragement, and support you have given to me over these past 50 years." However, approximately 100 Québécois protesters were seen when the royal motorcade crossed from Ottawa into Gatineau and Quebec Premier Bernard Landry stated that the provincial government would neither mount any celebrations of the anniversary, nor send representatives to any others, in protest of the Queen's signing of the Constitution Act, 1982.

Just prior to the tour, the group Citizens for a Canadian Republic was formed to promote the replacement of the constitutional monarchy with some kind of republic and attention was drawn to this cause when then-Deputy Prime Minister John Manley became the first-ever federal minister of the Crown to publicly support the end of the Canadian monarchy, saying in an interview that Canada should become a republic upon the demise of Queen Elizabeth II.

In December the next year, after lengthy discussions between the federal government and the Acadian community, Governor General Adrienne Clarkson put her signature on the Royal Proclamation of 2003, which expressed the Crown's acknowledgement of the 1754 deportation of the Acadians and established 28 July as the Day of Commemoration of the Great Upheaval; While not a formal apology, the gesture quelled demands by Acadians that one be issued by the Queen.

The Queen and the Duke of Edinburgh toured Alberta and Saskatchewan in 2005, to partake in celebrations marking those provinces' centennials. The Cabinet of Alberta wished for the monarch to personally grant royal assent to a bill passed by the provincial legislature; however, the constitutionality of the Queen doing so was questioned and Rideau Hall stated the Queen's personal participation in the legislative process would conflict with the federal government's policy of the "Canadianization" of Canada's institutions.

In 2006, Stephen Harper was appointed as prime minister. In his first address to Parliament as head of government, Harper opened by paying tribute to the Queen and her "lifelong dedication to duty and self-sacrifice," referring to her specifically as Canada's head of state.

Prince Harry arrived in Canada to train, along with other soldiers of the Canadian and British armies, at Canadian Forces Base Suffield, near Medicine Hat, Alberta, ahead of a tour of duty in Afghanistan. Harry went off base during down time and journeyed to Calgary to take in the nightlife. At the same time, Harry's aunt, the Princess Royal, was in Saskatchewan meeting with family members of Saskatchewan soldiers killed in Afghanistan. This was part of a wider tour of the province that included her participation in ceremonies to mark the centennial of the Royal Regina Rifles, of which she is Colonel-in-Chief, as well as opening the Royal Canadian Mounted Police Heritage Centre and meeting with First Nations elders at Government House.

Nearing the end of 2007, it was revealed that the Queen was not going to attend the festivities for the 400th anniversary of the foundation of Quebec City, to take place the next year. The Executive Council of Quebec had requested that Ottawa make plans for the sovereign to be part of the celebration, having her follow in the footsteps of her grandfather, George V, who presided over the tercentenary celebrations of the same event in 1908. However, the federal Cabinet advised the Queen not to go, fearing her presence would provoke Quebec separatists, especially after the announcement of her possibly attending incited separatists to promise protests. Governor General Michaëlle Jean attended, instead.

The then-Duke and Duchess of Cambridge, just three months after their marriage, toured all regions of Canada in 2011, from the Arctic to the West Coast and the Maritimes. The journey fell on the 225th anniversary of the first royal tour of Canada, by then-Prince William (later King William IV). William and Catherine attened a citizenship ceremony on 1 july—the first time any memeber of the royal family had done so—and, on the same day, the Canada Day celebrations on Parliament Hill.

Official celebrations for Queen Elizabeth's Diamond Jubilee began two years before the event, during Elizabeth's tour of Canada in 2010. During it, she, among other things, planted an Amber Jubilee Ninebark shrub—a cultivar created specifically for the Jubilee—in the newly-dedicated Queen Elizabeth II Garden outside her official residence in Manitoba and, at Rideau Hall, unveiled a stained glass window, depicting herself and Queen Victoria (the only other monarch of Canada who marked a diamond jubilee), that would, later that year, be installed in the Senate foyer and unveilled by Governor General David Johnston. The jubilee proper started with Diamond Jubilee week, starting on 6 February (Accession Day) 2012, with the raising of the Queen's Canadian royal standard on Parliament Hill and at all government houses and viceregal offices across the country; permission for the breach of protocol (the flag is normally flown only to mark the sovereign's presence) was granted by Elizabeth. Event were organized and educational programs established throughout the country, by federal, provincial, and municipal governments and exhibitions were mounted at museums and institutions from the Canadian Postal Museum to the Canadian Museum of History. The Royal Canadian Mint also issued an "extensive set" of coins to mark the anniversary.

The Queen re-opened a renovated Canada House in 2015. In the same year, on 9 September, Elizabeth became the second-longest reigning monarch of Canada (after King Louis XIV of France), though she was still celebrated as the "longest-reigning sovereign in Canada's modern era". The Bank of Canada, Canada Post, and the Royal Canadian Mint issued a commemorative bank note, stamp, and coin, respectively. A 30-minute performance of music "reflecting Her Majesty's life and times" was played on the Peace Tower Carillon on Parliament Hill. The Governor General, lieutenant governors, and territorial commissioners delivered a loyal address to the Queen.

Elizabeth addressed Canadians by video on the first day of 2017, recognizing the 150th anniversary of Confederation; she said, "throughout the years, particularly since your centennial year, I have watched Canada develop into a remarkable nation. [...] Fifty years ago, on the eve of the centennial, I encouraged Canadians to continue to embody the values of equality, freedom, and inclusion. Today, these values remain deeply rooted in the Canadian experience [...] On this eve of national celebrations, my family and I are with you in spirit. As you prepare to mark this important milestone in your country’s history, I send my warmest good wishes to you all." Prince Charles represented his mother, the Queen, at the main sesquicentennial events in Ottawa. 

During the COVID-19 pandemic, the Queen expressed her support for all Canadians and thanks to those who were caring for the vulnerable and providing essential services. As the pandemic waned into 2022, celebrations were mounted around the country and throughout the year to mark the Queen's Platinum Jubilee; the first-ever such event in Canadian history. It was also, though, the first time since at least Queen Victoria's Golden Jubilee in 1887 that the federal Cabinet did not advise the Crown to issue an associated commemorative medal. In response, six provinces produced their own Platinum Jubilee medals; another first. From 2021 into 2022, the subject of reconciliation with Canada's indigenous peoples came to the forefront of the public consciousness, particularly in regard to residential schools. Statues of Queen Victoria and Queen Elizabeth II in Winnipeg were vandalized. On the first National Day for Truth and Reconciliation, Elizabeth made a public statement, saying she "joins with all Canadians [...] to reflect on the painful history that indigenous peoples endured in residential schools in Canada and on the work that remains to heal and to continue to build an inclusive society." In 2021, the Queen appointed Mary Simon as the first indigenous governor general in Canadian history.

After Elizabeth's reign

Queen Elizabeth II passed away on 8 September 2022, and was succeeded by her eldest son, King Charles III. The last public statement the Queen made in her lifetime was sent, the day before, to express her condolences to, and support for, Canadians across the country in the aftermath of the 2022 Saskatchewan stabbings, saying she "mourn[s] with all Canadians at this tragic time". The monarch's death came as "an existential shock to Canadians who had known only one sovereign" in their lifetimes. Elizabeth's passing, however, did not disrupt daily life as much as those of her predecessors did; business outside of parliaments, ministries, the civil service, and the military largely carried on as usual; with only five day's notice of the national holiday called for the day of the funeral, financial secors stated they would operate normally, while the decisions of provincial governments were mixed on whether public servants or schools would take the day off: Ontario, Quebec, Saskatchewan, and Alberta chose neither; the Martime provinces and British Columbia chose both; and Manitoba chose one, but not the other. Still, many Canadians paid tribute at legislatures and city halls and online. The Internet—a technological system inconceivable at the beginning of Elizabeth’s reign—allowed Canadians and news media, alike, to follow events in near-real- or real-time, from the moment the Queen's final illness was made known until her death was confirmed by Buckingham Palace, which it did through Twitter and other social media platforms, in addition to the traditional announcements on palace gates.

On 10 September, the proclamation of the new King took place at Rideau Hall, following a formal meeting of the King's Privy Council for Canada, at a ceremony that included heraldic trumpeting, a 21-gun salute and a moment of remembrance for Queen Elizabeth II. The accession of Charles III was the first since the creation of the Canadian Heraldic Authority in 1989, that the Chief Herald read the royal proclamation aloud.

After the 2022 Quebec general election, the elected Parti Québécois members of the Legislative Assembly, briefly joined by members of the equally separatist Québec solidaire party, refused to recite the oath of allegiance to the King of Canada, rendering them unable to take their seats in the provincial parliament. The legislature, with the nationalist Coalition Avenir Québec in the government benches, passed a law that attempted to amend the Canadian constitution to make the Oath of Allegiance optional for MNAs. It remains unclear if the law has any effect.

Monarchs of Canadian territories

The line of monarchs who reigned over territories that would become Canadian or over Canada itself begins approximately at the turn of the 16th century. The date of the first establishment a monarchical form of government in parts of the territory which now forms Canada varies: some sources give the year as 1497, when King Henry VII claimed parts of Newfoundland, while others put it at 1534, when New France was founded in the name of King Francis I. Monarchical governance thenceforth evolved under a continuous succession of French and British sovereigns, and eventually the legally distinct Canadian monarchy. Since John Cabot first lay claim to Canada in the name of Henry VII, there have been 33 sovereigns of Canada, including two sets of co-sovereigns.

See also

 History of Canada
 History of monarchy in Alberta
 History of monarchy in British Columbia
 History of monarchy in Manitoba
 History of monarchy in New Brunswick 
 History of monarchy in Newfoundland and Labrador
 History of monarchy in Nova Scotia
 History of monarchy in Ontario
 History of monarchy in Quebec
 History of monarchy in Saskatchewan
 Monarchism in Canada
 Republicanism in Canada
 Royal tours of Canada

Notes

References

External links
 
 Royal Journey, a 1951 NFB documentary on the Royal Visit by Princess Elizabeth and the Duke of Edinburgh

Fathers of Confederation
Canada, monarchy in
Legal history of Canada
Monarchy in Canada